50 Years of Blonde on Blonde is a live album by Old Crow Medicine Show. It is a track-for-track tribute to Bob Dylan's landmark 1966 double album Blonde on Blonde.

Production
50 Years of Blonde on Blonde was recorded live at the CMA Theater at the Country Music Hall of Fame, in Nashville, Tennessee, in May 2016. The concert coincided with a Hall of Fame exhibit exploring Dylan's time in Nashville. In an interview, band members Ketch Secor and Critter Fuqua described how they had bonded over Dylan's songs as teenagers, and that the 50 Years... project was a natural extension of that collaboration. While the new recording follows the sequence of Dylan's original track-for-track, Old Crow took considerable liberties with the arrangement of individual tracks, for instance reimagining "Pledging My Time" as a "hillbilly breakdown," and "Obviously 5 Believers" as "a manic fiddle riot." The recording was released as an album on April 28, 2017. It was the band's first release on their new label, Columbia Records, which had released Dylan's original album in 1966.

Personnel
Ketch Secor – Vocals, fiddle, harmonica, banjo, mandolin, guitar
"Critter" Fuqua – Guitar, vocals, banjo, accordion, dobro, drums
Kevin Hayes – Guitjo, harmonica & backing vocals on track 1, lead vocals on track 7
Morgan Jahnig – Upright bass, backing vocals on track 1
Chance McCoy – Guitar, kazoo, backing vocals, fiddle, dobro, banjo, co-lead vocals on track 12
Cory Younts – Keyboards, backing vocals, mandolin, drums, marching snare drum, whistle
Joe Andrews - Banjo, pedal steel guitar, mandolin, dobro, marching bass drum
Robert Price - Drums on track 10

Live performances
Old Crow Medicine Show undertook a planned 27-date tour in support of 50 Years... in May and June, 2017. Shows were scheduled in the United States, United Kingdom, and the Netherlands.

Track listing
The track listing mirrors that of the original album. All tracks written by Bob Dylan.

See also
List of songs written by Bob Dylan
List of artists who have covered Bob Dylan songs

Notes

External links
Rolling Stone – How Old Crow Medicine Show Reimagined Blonde on Blonde
The New Yorker – Talkin Fifty Years of Bob Dylan's Blonde on Blonde

2017 albums
Old Crow Medicine Show albums
Albums produced by Ted Hutt
Columbia Records live albums
Bob Dylan tribute albums